Quercus planipocula is a species of oak. It is native to western Mexico in Sinaloa, Nayarit, and Guerrero.

References

External links
photo of herbarium specimen at Missouri Botanical Garden, collected in Nayarit in 1897

planipocula
Endemic oaks of Mexico
Flora of the Sierra Madre Occidental
Flora of the Sierra Madre del Sur
Flora of the Trans-Mexican Volcanic Belt
Trees of Northwestern Mexico
Trees of Southwestern Mexico
Least concern flora of North America
Plants described in 1924
Taxonomy articles created by Polbot
Taxa named by William Trelease